Bravo is an Italian international company that produces machines for gelato, pastry, chocolate and savory food production.

Story 
It was founded in 1967 in Montecchio Maggiore as an industrial machine manufacturing company which produced machines for gelato shops by Genesio Bravo. Initially the production was focused on multi-machines, pasteurizers and batch freezers, until 1974 when Genesio Bravo conceived and built the first multi-purpose machine for the production of artisanal gelato, called "Trittico".

Over the years the company has grown in terms of turnover, repositioning itself in the market, increasing the production of machines and models, expanding the sales network and progressively inaugurating various branches in the world: in 1982 opens subsidiary in France, in 2010 the Asiatic one and in 2011 the North American one.

Notes

External links
Official website Bravo SpA

Italian brands
Industrial machine manufacturers
Engineering companies of Italy
Manufacturing companies established in 1967
Italian companies established in 1967
Companies based in Veneto
Multinational companies headquartered in Italy